Russian postmodernism refers to the cultural, artistic, and philosophical condition in Russia since the downfall of the Soviet Union and dialectical materialism.  With respect to statements about post-Soviet philosophy or sociology, the term is primarily used by non-Russians to describe the state of economic and political uncertainty they observe since the fall of communism and the way this uncertainty affects Russian identity.  'Postmodernism' is, however, a term often used by Russian critics to describe contemporary Russian art and literature.

Artistic origins
In art, postmodernism entered the Soviet Union in the 1960s after the end of the Stalinist move toward liberalization with the advent of the Russian conceptualist movement.  Beginning as an underground political-artistic move against the use of Socialist realism as a method of social control and becoming a full-fledged movement with the Moscow Conceptualists, Russian conceptualism used the symbolism of Socialist realism against the Soviet government.

See also
 History of the Soviet Union (1953–1964)
 History of the Soviet Union (1964–1982)
 History of the Soviet Union (1982–1991)
 History of post-Soviet Russia
 Mark Lipovetsky
 Modernism
 Postmodernism
 Russian literature
 Socialist realism
 Soviet Nonconformist Art

External links
The Origins and Meaning of Russian Postmodernism, Mikhail Epstein
Russian Postmodernism at Literary Encyclopedia

Postmodernism
Postmodern art